The Schimek Family (German: Familie Schimek – Wiener Herzen) is a 1926 German silent comedy film directed by Alfred Halm and Rudolf Dworsky and starring Livio Pavanelli, Olga Tschechowa, and Lydia Potechina. It was shot at the EFA Studios in Berlin. The film's sets were designed by the art director Jacek Rotmil. It is based on the 1915 play of the same title by Gustaf Kadelburg, later adapted into a 1935 German film and a 1957 Austrian film.

Cast
 Livio Pavanelli as Franz Kaltenbach - Industrieller  
 Olga Tschechowa as Olga, seine Frau  
 Lydia Potechina as Kaltenbachs Schwiegermutter  
 Ernst Rückert as Dragoner-Leutnant  
 Max Hansen as K. K. Kadett  
 Hans Wallner as K. K. Feldwebel  
 Paul Morgan as Vormundschaftsrichter  
 Hermann Picha as Nepomuk Zavadil  
 Margarete Kupfer as Frau Schimel - Tischlerswitwe  
 Xenia Desni as Lisl  
 Illo Gutschwager as Willi - ihr Kind 
 Karl Dehnert as Franzl, ihr Kind  
 William Dieterle as Josef Baumann - Tischlergeselle  
 Fritz Greiner as Chauffeur

References

Bibliography
 Hans-Michael Bock and Tim Bergfelder. The Concise Cinegraph: An Encyclopedia of German Cinema. Berghahn Books.

External links
 

1926 films
German silent feature films
Films of the Weimar Republic
Films directed by Alfred Halm
Films directed by Rudolf Dworsky
German films based on plays
German black-and-white films
Films shot at Halensee Studios
German comedy films
1926 comedy films
1920s German films